Petros Peloponnesios ("Peter the Peloponnesian") or Peter the Lampadarios (c. 1735 Tripolis–1778 Constantinople) was a great cantor, composer and teacher of Byzantine and Ottoman music. He must have served as second domestikos between his arrival about 1764 until the death of Ioannes Trapezountios, and it is assumed that he became lampadarios (leader of the left choir) between 1770 and 1778 at the Great Church of Constantinople, after Daniel the Protopsaltes became Archon Protopsaltes. Large parts of the monodic chant sung in several current traditions of Orthodox Chant are transcriptions of his compositions, which he had written down as a teacher of the "New Music School of the Patriarchate".

Life 
Petros was born at Tripolis (Morea) between 1730 and 1740. According to Georgios Papadopoulos he was educated in the monastic communities of Smyrna. In 1764 he came to Constantinople to study with Ioannes Trapezountios, the Archon Protopsaltes, while Daniel like Ioannes student of Panagiotes Halacoğlu was Lampadarios at the Great Church of Constantinople. Petros could serve there as second domestikos who was usually in charge to notate the versions sung by the cantors with the higher ranks. Between 1770 and 1778 he served as lampadarios (leader of the left choir), until he became ill.

Together with Iakovos the Protopsaltes, the first domestikos between 1764 and 1776, he followed the first Archon Protopsaltes Daniel as official teacher of the New Music School of the Patriarchate in 1776.  He also taught Petros Byzantios he chose as second domestikos after being announced as lampadarios, and composed many exercises for his students. The term "" usually referred to the  way to embellish the old stichera (sticheron kalophonikon, anagrammatismos), the old heirmoi (heirmos kalophonikos), certain theotokia or kontakia. Its method was usually taught by John Koukouzeles' «Mega Ison».

Within other musical traditions of the Ottoman Empire, Petros had a very exceptional knowledge of makamlar, probably even of Armenian chant, and even if he did not invent the new analytical way to use Middle Byzantine notation, he had the reputation to have a very profound understanding of music which enabled him to notate music after just have listened to it once, even music which was not composed according to the octoechos. He also had the reputation of being a rather intrigant musician. On the one hand, Hafiz invited him and were very eager to learn even makam melodies from him (probably rather a Greek way of developing them), on the other hand, he was called "Hırsız" (thief) and "Hoca Petros" (teacher), because he had many students coming from a different traditional background. Since he could easily memorise compositions and he liked to change them and perform them in such a convincing way, that some musicians asked for his "permission", before they published them. Petros was also strongly associated with the Mevlevi tekke in Peran. But he was not the first Archon Protopsaltes of the Great Church who had an interest in makam music documented by neume transcriptions of makam music, already Panagiotes Halacoğlu who preceded Ioannes as Archon Protopsaltes (ca. 1726–1736), had it. Halacoğlu's student Kyrillos Marmarinos transcribed makamlar into Byzantine neumes and both wrote treatises about it. Petros was in his forties, when he died during a plague in Constantinople which killed a third of its population.

Petros' contribution to church and makam music 

His reputation- as an important teacher and composer - is mainly based on his vast contributions concerning the Heirmologion (Katavaseion or Heirmologion argon, printed the first time in transcription in 1825) and the short or simple Sticherarion (Doxastarion syntomon, printed the first time in transcription in 1820). These innovations of Orthodox chant had been written during his last years and parts of it were likely continued by his second domestikos Petros Byzantios who followed him as lampadarios, but also as teacher at the New Music School of the Patriarchate. According to Chrysanthos, Petros Peloponnesios' realisations for the Anthology of the Divine Liturgies (like the Papadic cherubikon, and koinonikon cycles) were already written, while he was still second domestikos and not supposed to contribute with own compositions. Later as lampadarios, Petros did not simply transcribe and contribute to the new  created by his masters Ioannes and Daniel, he also studied the Byzantine tradition as well as innovative Protopsaltes of the Ottoman period like Petros Bereketis. Sometimes he simply pointed at the  project he shared with Daniel the Protopsaltes and other students of Ioannes. He did not write down the background of a traditional melos as was the traditional synoptic use of notation, but also details of a personal realisation like in case of the doxastikon of Kassia's troparion, which he specified "in imitation of Daniel the Protopsaltes".

Petros Peloponnesios' abridged Doxastarion was one of the first transcriptions of idiomela according to a new simple ""-style which was created by Ioannes Trapezountios. The necessity for such an abridgement followed a request by Patriarch Cyril V in 1756, after the melos of the old sticherarion in the tradition of 17th-century composers like Georgios Raidestinos, Panagiotes the New Chrysaphes, and Germanos of New Patras had become too elaborated. Petros' Doxastarion and its rhythmic style was very controversially discussed among the other teachers at the New Music School of the Patriarchate, especially by Petros' rival Iakovos.

Petros' reputation was not limited to the field of Orthodox chant, he also "composed" and transcribed other genres of Armenian and Ottoman (even composers of the 14th century), including Ottoman makam genres like Peşrev, Taksim and Saz semai which were usually included in cyclic compositions known as Fasıl, but also makam compositions following usul rhythms over Greek texts (Tragodia rhomaïka). According to Kyriakos Kalaitzidis between three and five manuscripts with Makam transcriptions written by Petros' hand have survived, where Petros did also suggest their cyclic organisation as Fasıl. With the Codex Gritsanis 3, Petros created one of the most important collections of classical Ottoman music between the 14th and the 18th centuries.

Works 
The following list refers to the common ascription of the largest repertoire of monodic Orthodox chant to Petros, except the Anastasimatarion syntomon, ascribed to Petros by Chrysanthos and contemporary scribes, but nowadays regarded as a contribution by Daniel the Protopsaltes. Concerning the Koinonikon cycle, some Anthologies present two different cycles, one of them is supposed to be composed by Petros. The ascription of such a big part to Petros is still a controversial issue, even if his contribution can hardly be underestimated.

Books 
Anastasimatarion neon (sticheraric kekragaria and troparia)
Heirmologion argon of the Katavasies (slow heirmologic melos of the )
Doxastarion syntomon (Doxastika idiomela of the Menaion, the Triodion, and the Pentekostarion in the new fast sticheraric melos)
All compositions by Petros Bereketis

Hesperinos 
Traditional realisation of the hymn «φῶς ἱλαρὸν»
Kekragaria syntoma (sticheraric melos, abridged version of the Kekragaria published in the Anastasimatarion)
Kekragaria (see Anastasimatarion neon) and Anoixantaria in the sticheraric syntomon melos
Makarios aner
The great evening Prokeimena for Saturdays of the Lenten Period
Idiomela aposticha (fast and slow sticheraric melos) for Saturdays of the Lenten Period
Apolytikia katanyktika for Saturdays of the Lenten Period

Mesonyktikon and Orthros 
Triadika troparia «Άξιον εστίν»
Evlogetaria in the slow heirmologic melos (base κε)
Evlogetaria in the slow heirmologic melos (base δι)
Polyeleos despotikos «Δούλοι Κύριον»
Polyeleos despotikos «Λόγον Αγαθόν» (diatonic ) 
Polyeleos «Βαβυλώνος Αλληλούϊα»
3 Pasapnoaria heothina (two in )
Psalm 50 (fast )
Pentekostaria of Psalm 50 in the slow melos of 
Pentekostaria of the Triodion
Megalynaria timiotera in the fast melos (eight echoi)
Megalynaria timiotera in the slow melos (eight echoi)
Fast Doxologiai (eight echoi)
Slow Doxologiai ( and )
First Antiphonon (slow )
Anavathmoi (slow melos)

Great Compline (Lenten period) 
Heirmos «Την πάσαν ελπίδα μου»
Kontakion «Ψυχή μου,ψυχή μου»
Heirmos «Ασπόρου συλλήψεως»
Troparion «Πάντων προστατεύεις»
Sticheron prosomoion «Σφαγήν σου την άδικον»

Triodion of the Doxastarion argon 
Doxastikon apostichon over the Troparion of Holy Wednesday by Kassia «Κύριε, ἡ ἐν πολλαῖς ἁμαρτίαις» in the style of Daniel the Protopsaltes (slow sticheraric melos)
Doxastikon apostichon «Κύριε αναβαίνοντός σου»
Doxastikon apostichon for Hesperinos of Good Friday «Σε τον αναβαλλόμενον το φώς»

Divine Liturgy 
Resurrection hymn «Χριστός ανέστη» (slow sticheraric melos)
Typika (Antiphonon 1 in echos plagios , Antiphonon 2 in )
Makarismoi
Eisodika «Δεύτε προσκυνήσωμεν» «Εκ γαστρός»
Fast and slow Trisagion with short Dynamis
Antitrisagion «Οσοι εις Χριστόν» with short Dynamis 
Fast Antitrisagion «Τον Σταυρόν σου» with short Dynamis
Processional Mele «Κύριε σώσον» 
Paracletic «Κύριε ελέησον» 
«Δόξα σοι Κύριε-Εις πολλά έτη» sung after Gospel ( according to patriarchal gospel recitation)

Cherubim chant 
Two weekly cycles in various transcriptions by Chourmouzios the Archivist, Gregorios the Protopsaltes etc.
Two anticherouvika for Maundy Thursday «Του δείπνου σου»
Anticherouvikon for Holy Saturday «Σιγησάτω» (echos plagios protos)
Two anticherouvika or the Liturgy of Presanctified Gifts «Κατευθυνθήτω» and «Νυν αι δυνάμεις»

Communion chant 
Weekly cycle (Monday-Saturday)
Monday (echos protos, Angelic Feasts), Wednesday (Elevation of the Cross!), and Thursday Koinonikon (Apostle feasts) in long versions
Sunday Koinonikon cycle (long melos, eight echoi) 
Menaion cycle
Koinonikon for Cross Elevation «Εσημειώθη εφ'ημάς»
Christmas Koinonikon «Λύτρωσιν απέστειλε Κύριος»
Epiphany Koinonikon «Επιφανή χάρις του Θεού»
Annunciation Koinonikon (25 March) «Εξελέξατο κύριος την Σιών»
Two Koinonika for Transfiguration (6 August) «Εν τω φωτί της δόξης»
Triodion cycle 
Koinonikon for Lazarus Saturday «Εκ στόματος νηπίων» 
Koinonikon for Palm Sunday «Ευλογημένος ο ερχόμενος»
Koinonikon for Holy Saturday «Εξηγέρθη ως ο υπνών»
Pentekostarion cycle
Two Easter Koinonika «Σώμα Χριστού μεταλάβετε»
Antipascha Koinonikon «Επαίνει Ιερουσαλήμ τον Κύριον»
Mid-Pentecost Koinonikon «Ο τρώγων μου την σάρκα»
Koinonikon for Ascension «Ανέβη ο Θεός εν αλαλαγμώ»
Pentecost Koinonikon «Το πνεύμα σου το αγαθόν»
Two All Saints Koinonika «Αγαλλιάσθε δίκαιοι εν Κυρίω»

Older psaltic compositions 
Leitourgika by Ioannes Glykys
Allelouiarion «Ιδού ο Νυμφίος»

Mathemata and kratemata 
John Koukouzeles' mathema Mega Ison
Despotikon «Τον Δεσπότην και Αρχιερέα»
Great Trisagion for funerals
Theotokion kalophonikon «Σε μεγαλύνομεν» (diatonic )
John Koukouzeles' Theotokion kalophonikon «Ανωθεν οι Προφήται» (diatonic )
Akathistos kalophonikos «Ξένον Τόκον» (diatonic )
Exegeseis of older kalophonic compositions of the Oikematarion

Heirmologion kalophonikon 
Heirmos kalophonikos «Γόνυ κάμπτει»
Heirmos kalophonikos «Ουρανός πολύφωτος» (diatonic )
Exegeseis of older kalophonic compositions of the old Heirmologion

Sticherarion kalophonikon 
Sticheron kalophonikon (St. Euphemia) «Λίαν εύφρανας»
Exegeseis of older kalophonic compositions of the old Sticherarion
probably two of the kratemata printed in Gregorios the Protopsaltes' Heirmologion kalophonikon were composed as conclusions for the stichera kalophonika «Αναστάσεως ημέρα» ( and «Λίαν εύφρανας»

Makam music 
The recent research by Kyriakos Kalaitzidis has analysed 72 manuscripts which have makam music transcribed into Greek neumes between the 15th and the 19th centuries. Within this repertoire more than 100 compositions are ascribed to Petros, among them about 14 Phanariot songs. He also transcribed many other Ottoman composers. Although there are no contributions by Panagiotes Halacoğlu, Ioannes' teacher, his school together with Kyrillos Marmarinos' transcription of makam seyirler seems to be an essential contribution which encouraged other Phanariotes to follow his example. In comparison, 2 makam compositions by Kyrillos survived, 2 others by Ioannes. There is no composition ascribed to Daniel, but the music manuscripts written by himself had been burnt in its library, and most of the makam music transcribed by Petros have no ascriptions at all. 12 compositions are ascribed to Iakovos the Protopsaltes, 10 to Petros' student Petros Byzantios, even Gregorios the Protopsaltes who was a student of the Mevlevi composer Dede Efendi, left not more than 31 compositions in sources with Greek neumes. The very truth behind Petros' reputation as Hırsız ("thief") as it was documented by Georgios Papadopoulos, is that Petros had a crucial role as a notator of the Patriarchate, despite his short lifetime and his early announcement as lampadarios, he must have continued to fulfill his former duties as a second domestikos even as lampadarios. But the difficult question of authorship has to be revealed by further research.

Reception 
In the current tradition of Orthodox chant, known as "Psaltike" (the heritage of Byzantine psaltic art), the contributions of Petros Peloponnesios (his Katavasies for the Heirmologion, his Doxastarion and many of his compositions for the Anthology of the liturgies) are dominant in the neumed editions of Orthodox chant in Bulgaria, Romania, Macedonia, Serbia and Greece.

Notes

Sources and editions

Manuscripts in exegetic notation

Church music

Makam music

Printed and transcribed editions of Petros Peloponnesios' works

Petros' Anastasimatarion and its translation into Romanian and into Old Church Slavonic

Gregorios' transcription of Daniel the Protopsaltes' 'Anastasimatarion syntomon' (heirmologic melos)

Chourmouzios' transcription of the 'Anastasimatarion neon' (sticheraric and heirmologic melos)

Heirmologion of the Katavasiai (heirmologion argon)

Doxastarion syntomon (fast sticheraric melos)

John Koukouzeles' 'Mega Ison' (Chourmouzios' transcription of Petros Peloponnesios' exegesis)

References

External links

Recordings of oktoechos compositions

Recordings of makam compositions 
Petros Peloponnesios. "Tribute to his work". Gerasimos Papadopoulos & Aura Duet (voice, tanbur, ney, bendir).

Byzantine composers
Composers from the Ottoman Empire
1730s births
1778 deaths
18th-century Greek people
Eastern Orthodox liturgical music
Greek musicians
Ottoman classical music
Greeks from the Ottoman Empire
People from the Peloponnese
18th-century classical composers
18th-century male musicians
Male classical composers
18th-century Greek musicians
18th-century Greek educators